Janu may refer to one of the following:

Janu, a clan of Jats originally from Jandwa
 Janů, Czech surname